88 Antop Hill is a 2003 mystery thriller Hindi film. The story, screenplay and direction are by Kushan Nandy; dialogues by Ashish Deo. The film is a murder mystery and is loosely based on James Hadley Chase's 1954 novel Tiger by The Tail and was released on 27 June 2003.

Plot 
The film opens with the brutal murder of Neeraj Shah. His body is dumped in the trunk of a car. On the other side bank executive Pratyush Shelar gets home late on his anniversary because he had to console an old college classmate about her marital woes. His own marital woes are worsened when his wife Antara leaves their home with their daughter. Pratyush's colleague Aslam Durrani suggests an exotic dancer Teesta. Pratyush is not interested but Aslam calls Pratyush and pretends as though some thugs are about to kill him. He asks Pratyush to come immediately to 88 Antop Hill. Later Teesta is mysteriously murdered. Scared and confused, Pratyush leaves immediately and become chased by local police. Suspicion goes upon him. Pratyush contacts cops but a dimwitted cop sternly asks him to surrender, as the police have found the murder weapon and a blood stained shirt, with Pratyush's diary. Here detective inspector Arvind Khanvilkar takes the charge of investigation.

Cast
 Rahul Dev as Inspector Arvind Khanvilkar
 Atul Kulkarni as Pratyush Shelar
 Shweta Menon as Teesta
 Subrat Dutta as Prashant
 Jasmine D'Souza as Sonali
 Suchitra Pillai as Antara
 Harsh Khurana as Aslam Durrani
 Shauket Baig as Murli Mansukhani
 Sachin Dubey as Neeraj
 Sharad Ponkshe as Police officer
 Sanjay Singh as K. K. Memon

Reception
Taran Adarsh of  IndiaFM gave the film 1 out of 5, ″On the whole, 88 ANTOP HILL is high on technique, but low on substance.″ Deepa Gumaste of Rediff.com wrote ″ilms like 88 Antop Hill don't exactly need a saving grace -- they are better off not being made at all. But if there is something worth a mention, it is a couple of scary moments and solid performances from Atul Kulkarni and Rahul Dev. Both actors rise above the frailties of the film (and the rest of the cast), but their heroic efforts aren't enough to salvage the situation.″

References

External links 
 

2003 films
2000s Hindi-language films
2000s mystery thriller films
Indian mystery thriller films
Indian detective films
Hindi-language thriller films
Films based on works by James Hadley Chase